Šolom Moiseevič Dvolajckij (S. M. Dvolaitsky; 1893–27 November, 1937) was a Soviet economist and state official. 

Dvolajckij was born in Žagarė, Lithuania, then part of the Russian Empire.

He collaborated  with Alexander Bogdanov in producing the 10th revised edition of Kratkii kurs ekonomicheskoi nauki (1920) which appeared in an English translation by Joe Fineberg as A Short Course in Economic Science (1923).

However Bogdanov was to criticise Dvolajckij's view that the method of K. Marx’s Das Kapital was not applicable to the analysis of non-capitalist social-economic formations.

In 1928 his Ćastnyj kapital v torgovle SSSR was published in Russia.

In 1934 his translation of a chapter of Rosa Luxemburg's The Accumulation of Capital was published in Moscow: Tugan-Baranovsky

He was director of the Department of Culture and Propaganda of the Azov-Black Sea Territorial Committee of the All-Union Communist Party (bolsheviks) from 1936–7 when he was purged. He was arrested on 15 October 1937 and tried and shot on 27 November 1937. His ashes are buried in the Donskoye Cemetery

References

1893 births
1937 deaths
People from Žagarė
People from Shavelsky Uyezd
Jews from the Russian Empire
Soviet economists
Lithuanian Jews
Soviet Jews
Great Purge victims from Lithuania
Jews executed by the Soviet Union